PeaZip is a free and open-source file manager and file archiver for Microsoft Windows, ReactOS, Linux,  MacOS and BSD made by Giorgio Tani. It supports its native PEA archive format (featuring compression, multi volume split and flexible authenticated encryption and integrity check schemes) and other mainstream formats, with special focus on handling open formats. It supports 226 file extensions (as of version 8.6.0).

PeaZip is mainly written in Free Pascal, using Lazarus. PeaZip is released under the terms of the GNU Lesser General Public License.

Features 
The program features an archive browser interface with search and history features for intuitive navigation in archive's content, and allows the application of fine-grained multiple exclusion and inclusion filter rules to the archive; a flat browsing mode is possible as alternative archive browsing method.

PeaZip allows users to run extracting and archiving operations automatically using command-line generated exporting the job defined in the GUI front-end. It can also create, edit and restore an archive's layout for speeding up archiving or backup operation's definition.

Other notable features of the program include archive conversion, file splitting and joining, secure file deletion, byte-to-byte file comparison, archive encryption, checksum/hash files, find duplicate files, batch renaming, system benchmarking, random passwords/keyfiles generation, view image thumbnails (multi-threaded on the fly thumbnails generation without saving image cache to the host machine), and integration in the Windows Explorer context menu. In addition, the program's user interface (including icons and color scheme) can be customized.

Versions older than 2.6.1 were vulnerable to an improper input validation weakness, that has been patched in following versions.

From version 6.9.2 and newer, PeaZip support editing files inside archives (E.g.: Open a text file, add text and save it without unzipping the file); from that version forward, it also supports adding files to subfolders in an already created archive, in addition to maintaining the ability to add files to archives to the root directory.

PeaZip is available for IA-32 and x86-64 as natively standalone, portable application and as installable package for Microsoft Windows, Linux (DEB, RPM and TGZ, compiled both for GTK2 and Qt widgetset), and BSD (GTK2). It is available also as PortableApps package (.paf.exe) and for Microsoft's winget Windows Package Manager

Along with more popular and general-purpose archive formats like 7z, Tar, Zip etc., PeaZip supports the ZPAQ, PAQ, and LPAQ formats. Although usually not recommended for general purpose use (due to high memory usage and low speed), those formats are included for the value as cutting edge compression technology, providing compression ratio among the best for most data structures.

PeaZip supports encryption with AES 256-bit cipher in 7z, and ZIP archive formats. In PeaZip's native PEA format, and in FreeArc's ARC format, supported ciphers are AES 256-bit, Blowfish, Twofish 256 and Serpent 256 (in PEA format, all ciphers are used in EAX authenticated encryption mode).

Native archive format 
PEA, an acronym for Pack Encrypt Authenticate, is an archive file format. It is a general purpose archiving format featuring compression and multiple volume output. The developers' goal is to offer a flexible security model through Authenticated Encryption, that provides both privacy and authentication of the data, and redundant integrity checks ranging from checksums to cryptographically strong hashes, defining three different levels of communication to control: streams, objects, and volumes.

It was developed in conjunction with the PeaZip file archiver. PeaZip and Universal Extractor support the PEA archive format.

Third-party technologies 
PeaZip acts as a graphical front-end for numerous third-party open source or royalty-free utilities, including:

 Igor Pavlov 7z executable and Myspace's p7zip, POSIX port of 7z under Linux 
 Google Brotli
 Bulat Ziganshin FreeArc, not to be confused with SEA's ARC
 Matt Mahoney at al PAQ8, ZPAQ and LPAQ
 Ilia Muraviev QUAD, BALZ, and BCM compressors
 GNU strip and UPX
Facebook Zstandard

Separate plugin (optional) 
 Marcel Lemke UNACEV2.DLL 2.6.0.0 and UNACE for Linux (royalty-free license from ACE Compression Software); being released under a non-OSI compliant license it is available as separate (free of charge) package on PeaZip Add-ons page, as PeaZip UNACE Plugin.
 Eugene Roshal unrar (royalty-free license from RarLab/Win.Rar GmbH, source available but subject to specific restriction in order to disallow creating a rar compressor); being released under a non-OSI compliant license it is available as separate (free of charge) package on PeaZip Add-ons page, as PeaZip UNRAR5 Plugin. This plugin is optional and only meant to provide an alternative unrar engine, as RAR and RAR5 formats are supported for extraction by PeaZip out of the box.

Most of these utilities can run both in console mode or through a graphical wrapper that allows more user-friendly handling of output information.

Supported formats

Full archiving and extraction support 

 7z and 7z-SFX
 FreeArc's ARC/WRC
 Brotli: br
 bzip2: bz2, tar.bz2, tbz, tb2
 gzip: gz, tar.gz, tgz
 PAQ8 (F/JD/L/O), LPAQ, ZPAQ
 PEA
 QUAD/BALZ/BCM
 tar
 WIM
 xz
 Zip
 Zstandard: zst, tzst

Browse/test/extract support 

 ACE (through optional separate plugin)
 ARJ
 appxbundle 
 CAB
 CHM
 Compound File (e.g. MSI, DOC, PPT, XLS)
 CPIO
 deb
 EAR
 ISO image
 JAR
 LZMA
 LZH
 NSIS installers
 OpenOffice's OpenDocument
 PET/PUP (Puppy Linux installers)
 PAK/PK3/PK4
 RAR including archives created with new RARv5 standard
 RPM
 SMZIP
 U3P
 WAR
 XPI
 Z (compress)
 ZIPX

Repair 
 FreeArc's ARC

Adware 
Prior to release 5.3, PeaZip installers for Windows and Win64 were bundled with an OpenCandy advertising module, which during installation offered optional installation of recommended third-party software; the official download page provided alternative installers without this module, named 'plain'.
From release 5.3 on (April 2014), PeaZip no longer has ad-supported bundle. PeaZip Portable and PeaZip for Linux packages never featured an ad-supported bundle.

See also 

 Comparison of file archivers
 Comparison of archive formats
 List of archive formats
 List of portable software

References

External links
 
 PEA archiving utility and file format specifications
 FAQ
 
 

 

2006 software
Cross-platform free software
File archivers
Free data compression software
Free file managers
Free software programmed in Pascal
Pascal (programming language) software
Portable software
Software using the LGPL license
Windows compression software